Marie-Hélène des Esgaulx (born 26 May 1950 in Dax, Landes) is a French politician and a member of the Senate of France. She represents the Gironde department and is a member of the Union for a Popular Movement Party.

References
Page on the Senate website

1950 births
Living people
People from Dax, Landes
Rally for the Republic politicians
Union for a Popular Movement politicians
The Republicans (France) politicians
Modern and Humanist France
Deputies of the 12th National Assembly of the French Fifth Republic
Deputies of the 13th National Assembly of the French Fifth Republic
French Senators of the Fifth Republic
Senators of Gironde
Mayors of places in Nouvelle-Aquitaine
Women members of the National Assembly (France)
Women mayors of places in France
Women members of the Senate (France)
21st-century French women politicians